We Go On and On is a studio album released on May 26, 1998 by the Washington, D.C.-based go-go band Rare Essence.

Track listing

A-Side
"Concentration (Intro)" – 2:04
"Player Haters" – 6:34
"What Would U Do for the Money?" – 4:37
"Stranded" – 0:46
"Overnight Scenario" – 4:56
"Super Chicken" – 0:42
"Make 'em Bounce" – 4:40
"Freaks Come Out at Night" (featuring D.J. Flexxx) – 6:23

B-Side
"Freaks" (featuring D.J. Flexxx) – 4:18
"Tell Me What U Want (1998)" – 5:10
"Greatest Hits" – 0:28
"We Go On and On" (featuring DJ Kool) – 6:00
"Cab Confessions" – 0:30
"Stars Be Partyin'" (featuring Kidd and Stinky Dink) – 5:21
"Watch Out Now!" (featuring Nonchalant) – 4:27
"Your Memory Lives On" – 5:29

Personnel
Michael "Funky Ned" Neal – bass guitar
Milton "Go-Go Mickey" Freeman – congas, timbales, percussions
Darrell "Blue-Eye" Arrington – drums
John "J.B." Buchanan – flugabone
Andre "Whiteboy" Johnson –electric guitar, vocals
Eric "Bojack" Butcher – rototoms, timbales, percussions
Kent Wood – keyboards
Byron "B.J." Johnson – keyboards
Anthony "Lil' Benny" Harley – trumpet, guest vocals
Darren "Mr. X" Frazier – sample board, vocals
Derek "D.P." Paige – trumpet, vocals
Donnell Floyd – saxophone, vocals
Charles "Shorty" Garris – vocals
Nonchalant – guest vocals

References

External links
We Go On and On at Discogs

1998 albums
Rare Essence albums